Kenneth Steven Pavey (born 23 August 1979) is an English former professional footballer who played as a midfielder.

Career

Early career 
Born in South London, Pavey made his debut at local club Athenley FC before moving to his boyhood favourite club Millwall. He ended his junior years at Sittingbourne where he also made his debut at senior level. A transfer to Premier League side Aston Villa fell through in 1998 because the two clubs involved could not agree on a transfer fee. Pavey instead moved to Swedish second division side Ljungskile SK where he remained until the 2005 season, except for a break during the 2002 season.

AIK 
Pavey was signed by Stockholm team AIK in October 2005, and was a regular in the starting line up.

In 2009, Pavey helped AIK to an unprecedented league and cup double, scoring a vital goal against local rivals Hammarby in the penultimate match of the season and then featuring in the Swedish Cup final in which AIK beat IFK Göteborg 2–0. His success at the time made him somewhat of a cult figure, both in Sweden and his native England. He was profiled on the popular football podcast The Football Ramble and was later interviewed live on air in a subsequent episode. In the interview, Pavey discussed the double win and his excitement at the prospect of playing Champions League football.
Pavey then went on to play in the Champions League on four occasions, UEFA Cup on six occasions and Europa League twice.

Return to Ljungskile SK 
After Pavey's AIK Contract expired, he re-signed for his former club Ljungskile SK for the 2012 season, currently playing in the Swedish second division.

Östers IF 
On 14 November 2012 it was revealed that Kenny Pavey would return to the Swedish first division having signed a two-year deal with Östers IF.

Return to AIK 
Pavey rejoined AIK on 15 January 2014.

Retirement 
In November 2019 40-year-old Pavey confirmed, that he would retire at the end of the 2019 season.

Honours
Ljungskile SK

Division 2 Västra Götaland:  2001, 2004

AIK
Allsvenskan: 2009
Svenska Cupen: 2009
Supercupen: 2010
Vasalund IF
Division 1 : 2018

References

External links
 Kenny Pavey profile at AIK website
 

1979 births
Living people
Footballers from Southwark
English footballers
English expatriate footballers
Association football midfielders
Sittingbourne F.C. players
Millwall F.C. players
Ljungskile SK players
AIK Fotboll players
Östers IF players
Assyriska FF players
Enskede IK players
Allsvenskan players
Ettan Fotboll players
Division 2 (Swedish football) players
English expatriate sportspeople in Sweden
Expatriate footballers in Sweden